Mihai Godea (born 25 January 1974) is a Moldovan politician. He became president of the Democratic Action Party on 6 November 2011.

Biography 
After finishing his studies in politics and history, Godea started an activist career in the NGO sector. In 1999 he was appointed as a program coordinator at “CONTACT” National Assistance and Information Center for NGOs in Moldova. Later in 2005, he became the Executive Director of the organization. He engaged in civic activities by being secretary of the Coalition for Rural Economic Development from  2003.

In the following years he became interested in politics. His first contribution to Moldovan political life was his collaboration with Democratic Party of Moldova in 2002. With Alexandru Tanase and Vladimir Filat he founded the Liberal Democratic Action Party in 2007, becoming its vice-president. From 2009 to 2011 he was a member of the Moldovan Parliament of the XVIIth, XVIIIth and XIXth Legislatures, where he led the PLDM parliamentary fraction. In 2011, he left the PLDM political party  to discourage the return of the Communist Party, running unsuccessfully for mayor of Chisinau, Moldova's capital. Despite losing, he contributed substantially to the victory of Dorin Chirtoaca, another pro-European democrat, against the communist candidate, Igor Dodon.

On 6 November 2011, Godea, with Viorel Chivriga, Natalia Ciobanu and Corneliu Gurin, founded the Democratic Action Party,  led by Godea.

References

External links 
 Mihai GODEA
 Site-ul Parlamentului Republicii Moldova
 Partidul Liberal Democrat din Moldova
 Mihai Godea's personal web page

1974 births
Living people
Moldova State University alumni
21st-century Moldovan historians
Liberal Democratic Party of Moldova MPs
Moldovan MPs 2009–2010